America on Wheels is an over-the-road transportation museum in Allentown, Pennsylvania.

The museum houses rotating exhibits on the second floor. Also on the second floor is the HubCap Cafe, 
and a vehicle art gallery featuring the work of artists.

The museum's collection features over 75 bicycles, motorcycles, automobiles and trucks in exhibits telling the story of people and products on the move from the days of the carriage to the vehicles of tomorrow.

The museum also houses the archives of Mack Trucks.

History 
As early as 1989, Allentown city officials had announced plans to revitalize an old industrial area, which included the abandoned Arbogast & Bastian meat packing plant, along the Lehigh River.  This redevelopment, which was to be known as "Lehigh Landing," was to include a museum, a brewery, walking trails, a footbridge across the river, and a promenade for festivals.  Development was hindered by fundraising problems, environmental remediation issues, and even a national debate on pork barrel government spending.  After three separate groundbreakings (2001, 2004 and 2005), the museum, which cost over $17 million to build, was officially opened to the public on April 12, 2008.

Collection and exhibits

1889 Nadig Gas-Powered Carriage
A historically important part of the museum's collection is the 1889 Nadig Gas-Powered Carriage, one of the first gas-powered vehicles driven in America.  Henry Nadig, a German-born mechanic living in Allentown, built his gas-powered carriage in 1889, two years before Charles E. Duryea's first gas-powered automobile.  Police forced him to drive the carriage at night, because during the day it scared horses.  The vehicle was discovered rusting in a collapsed shed in Allentown, and restored.

General collection
The collection of the America on Wheels is minimal as the majority of the vehicles on display are on loan.  The West Gallery changes every six months based on a new theme.  A number of the vehicles are on loan from the Mack Truck Museum of Allentown PA.

See also 
 List of automobile museums
 List of historic places in Allentown, Pennsylvania

References

External links 

 Official website

Automobile museums in Pennsylvania
Industry museums in Pennsylvania
Museums established in 2008
Museums in Allentown, Pennsylvania